"All Falls Down" is a song by American hip hop artist Kanye West. It was released as the third single from his debut album, The College Dropout. The song was written and produced by West and features singer Syleena Johnson. The hip hop song contains an interpolation of "Mystery of Iniquity" by Lauryn Hill from her live album MTV Unplugged No. 2.0, therefore Hill is credited as a composer.

It was released in February 2004 and entered the UK Singles Chart at number ten and peaked at number seven on the US Billboard Hot 100 on May 11, 2004, his first solo Top 10 hit in the USA. The song was nominated for Best Rap/Sung Collaboration at the 47th Grammy Awards, Viewer's Choice at the 2004 BET Awards and received nominations for a total of four awards at the 2004 MTV Video Music Awards. The original version of the single featuring Lauryn Hill's vocals sampled from "Mystery of Iniquity" on the chorus of the song, was featured in the Netflix documentary Jeen-Yuhs.

Background
The song contains an interpolation of "Mystery of Iniquity" by Lauryn Hill from her live album MTV Unplugged No. 2.0. West originally attempted to acquire legal clearance to sample the recording but due to various complications, the permission was withheld. West then called upon Syleena Johnson to re-sing the relevant vocal portions of "Mystery of Iniquity" which ended up in the final track. The version of the song with the original sample can be heard on West's Freshman Adjustment mixtape. However, the earliest version of the song can be found on West's 2001 mixtape The Prerequisite, on which it was called "Dream Come True". Lyrically, "All Falls Down" examines the self-consciousness and insecurity within society, particularly the black community, and how these characteristics pertain to economic materialism.

In a 2013 interview with The New York Times, West revealed Dead Prez's impact on the song;

"It wasn’t until I hung out with Dead Prez and understood how to make, you know, raps with a message sound cool that I was able to just write “All Falls Down” in 15 minutes.”

Live performances
West performed the song live on Def Poetry Jam in 2004 as a poem titled "Self Conscious". A performance of "All Falls Down" was included on West's 2006 live album Late Orchestration, which was recorded in 2005 at Abbey Road Studios in London. It was performed live by West in 2015 as the closer to his headlining set at Glastonbury.

The song was performed by West as part of a medley at the 2004 MTV Video Music Awards, as well on numerous television shows, including; Late Show with David Letterman, Total Request Live, The Tonight Show with Jay Leno, and Later... with Jools Holland.

Music video
The music video for "All Falls Down" was directed by Chris Milk and shot at Ontario International Airport in Ontario, California. It follows West as he accompanies his girlfriend, played by Stacey Dash, to the airport to catch her flight. The video is shot in first-person perspective, displaying the journey from their car to the airport terminal through West's eyes. The music video also features cameos by GLC, Consequence, Common,  Kel Mitchell, and Syleena Johnson, who features on the song, as the lady who checks Dash in at the airport reception. Complex named it the 18th best music video of the 2000s decade.

Lyrical analysis 

"All Falls Down" is placed as the fourth song of Kanye West's debut studio album, The College Dropout. The album is notable for containing complex societal issues, which West strives to advertently cover in ways relating to the Black American community. These thematic concepts, prevalent through the entirety of the album, are omnipresent within this specific song.

West in "All Falls Down" decides to vulnerably share his own imperfections. This shines through his divulge into chronic issues with personal insecurities, which he recognizes as a problem that relates to the greater population within society than just himself. Within the concept of insecurities, West makes the decision to specifically home in on the continuous, dividing matter of excessive materialism, or a desire for it, in an attempt to pertain to an affluent appearance. While focusing on this topic, he admits that although being subject to this affair, he knowingly understands the mindset contradictory to such a lifestyle pertaining to short-term, consumerist happiness. Yet, he still finds himself to be a participant in this way of life.

West also ties this thematic idea to an even deeper, underlying meaning. The reason this lifestyle is adopted is in an attempt to recompense for everything the Black American community has taken from them in the past. But, in the process of making up for the prior oppression they had received, West scrutinizes their new subjugation, this excessive materialism, as a result. West ends with a claim that he recognizes his submission to such a lifestyle, but also knows that it is not just him that falls subject to such behavior.

Hip hop journalist Davey D describes the song lyrically as "[describing] a number of Black pathologies including self-hate, drug abuse, and the worship of white wealth. [West] philosophically concludes that White men are the financial benefactors of all Black pathologies."

Accolades
Spin named "All Falls Down" the third best song of 2004.

Track listings

12" vinyl #1
A-Side
 "All Falls Down" (Clean)
 "All Falls Down" (Dirty)
 "All Falls Down" (A cappella)
B-Side
 "Get 'Em High" (Clean)
 "Get 'Em High" (Extended Dirty)
 "Get 'Em High" (A cappella)

12" vinyl #2
A-Side
 "All Falls Down" (Explicit)
 "All Falls Down" (Edited)

B-Side
 "Heavy Hitters" (Dirty)
 "Heavy Hitters" (A cappella)

CD single #1
 "All Falls Down" (Album Version Explicit)
 "Heavy Hitters" (Dirty)

CD single #2
 "All Falls Down"
 "Get 'Em High"
 "Heavy Hitters"
 "Through the Wire"

CD single #3
 "All Falls Down - Explicit"
 "All Falls Down" - Edited"
 "Heavy Hitters (Feat. GLC)"
 "Get 'Em High (Feat. Talib Kweli & Common)"
 "All Falls Down - Video"

Personnel
Information taken from The College Dropout liner notes.
Songwriters: Kanye West, Lauryn Hill
Producer: Kanye West
Record engineer: Tatsuya Sato, Rabeka Tunei
Mix engineer: Manny Marroquin
Guitar: Eric "E-Bass" Johnson
Acoustic guitar: Ken Lewis

Charts

Weekly charts

Year-end charts

Certifications

Release history

References

External links
"All Falls Down" Lyrics at MTV (archived from 2009)

2004 singles
Kanye West songs
Music videos directed by Chris Milk
Song recordings produced by Kanye West
Songs written by Kanye West
Songs written by Lauryn Hill
Roc-A-Fella Records singles
Def Jam Recordings singles
2004 songs
Songs about consumerism
Syleena Johnson songs